Puttita Supajirakul (born 29 March 1996) is a Thai badminton player who competed at the 2016 Summer Olympics in Rio de Janeiro, Brazil. She was part of Thailand's gold medals-winning team at the 2015, 2017 and 2019 Southeast Asian Games in the women's team event. She was also the women's doubles champion at the 2016 Thailand Open.

Achievements

BWF World Championships 
Women's doubles

Southeast Asian Games 
Women's doubles

Mixed doubles

BWF World Junior Championships 
Girls' doubles

Asian Youth Games 
Mixed doubles

Asian Junior Championships 
Girls' doubles

BWF World Tour (1 title, 1 runner-up) 
The BWF World Tour, announced on 19 March 2017 and implemented in 2018, is a series of elite badminton tournaments, sanctioned by Badminton World Federation (BWF). The BWF World Tour are divided into six levels, namely World Tour Finals, Super 1000, Super 750, Super 500, Super 300 (part of the HSBC World Tour), and the BWF Tour Super 100.

Women's doubles

 Mixed doubles

BWF Grand Prix (1 title, 4 runners-up) 
The BWF Grand Prix has two levels, the Grand Prix and Grand Prix Gold. It is a series of badminton tournaments, sanctioned by the Badminton World Federation (BWF) since 2007.

Women's doubles

  BWF Grand Prix Gold tournament
  BWF Grand Prix tournament

BWF International Challenge/Series (4 titles, 2 runners-up) 
Women's doubles

  BWF International Challenge tournament
  BWF International Series tournament

References

External links 

 
 
 

1996 births
Living people
Puttita Supajirakul
Puttita Supajirakul
Badminton players at the 2016 Summer Olympics
Puttita Supajirakul
Badminton players at the 2014 Asian Games
Badminton players at the 2018 Asian Games
Puttita Supajirakul
Asian Games medalists in badminton
Medalists at the 2018 Asian Games
Competitors at the 2013 Southeast Asian Games
Competitors at the 2015 Southeast Asian Games
Competitors at the 2017 Southeast Asian Games
Competitors at the 2019 Southeast Asian Games
Puttita Supajirakul
Puttita Supajirakul
Puttita Supajirakul
Southeast Asian Games medalists in badminton
Puttita Supajirakul